California Rangeland Trust is a nonprofit organization founded in 1998 by a group of innovative ranchers committed to conservation.

Private rangeland permanently protected by a conservation easement provides all the natural resource values of publicly owned land, but the valuable stewardship is provided with a little or no cost to the public. In addition, privately conserved lands remain on the tax roll to support our schools and other important services.

The Rangeland Trust remains focused on the highest standards of professional practices and is a Land Trust Alliance accredited organization, acting as a bridge between its constituencies and maintaining personal relationships with all its partners. It coordinates different types of conservation easements, matching funding sources to easement conservation values. The availability of public funding has vastly diminished and is even more difficult to obtain in rural localities than urban ones, while the need is equally as great in both.

The Rangeland Trust uses conservation easements as a tool to conserve rangeland properties. Working in close partnership with each property owner, the Rangeland Trust develops a customized legal agreement that inventories the land's agricultural, scenic, historical, and wildlife values and seeks to maintain the highest standards of animal husbandry and food production in a setting that sustains agriculture and habitat.
 
With a voluntary conservation easement in place, ranching families stay on their land and continue to serve as stewards of California's iconic landscapes and rich natural resources. The Rangeland Trust ensures that the landowner adheres to the terms of the conservation easement through ongoing monitoring that includes annual onsite inspections focused on mutual goals—conserving the land and the way of life on which it depends.

History

Steve Sinton was the Rangeland Trust's founding chairman. A graduate of Stanford University and the University of Colorado Law School, Stinton practiced water and environmental law in Sacramento, California and San Luis Obispo County for fifteen years before retiring to operate two family cattle ranches with his father and manage several commercial buildings in the City of San Luis Obispo. The Sinton family also operates a  vineyard. Steve is a member of the California Cattlemen's Association, the San Luis Obispo County Cattlemen's Association and the National Cattlemen's Beef Association, the San Luis Obispo County Water Resources Advisory Committee, and the San Luis Obispo County Native Tree Committee. Sinton was awarded the National American Farmland Trust Steward of the year in 2005.

Notable ranches

Notable ranches in the Trust's portfolio include:

 Yolo Land & Cattle Co., Yolo County
Yolo Land & Cattle Co. placed  into a conservation easement on March 25, 2005. This cattle ranch, located in the inner-coastal rangeland of the Blue Ridge Berryessa Natural Area, contains ponds, wetlands, streams and open spaces that provide habitat for many types of plants and wildlife.

 Ecker Ranch, Madera County
Ecker Ranch, a  ranch is now protected by an agricultural easement.

Tejon Ranch, Kern County
In 2000, California Rangeland Trust accepted the donation of a  easement as mitigation for a commercial development located in the northwest corner of Tejon Ranch. As a condition of approval for the development, Tejon Ranch Company donated an easement on nearby grazing land in order to protect the habitat for the San Joaquin kit fox and blunt-nosed leopard lizard.

Hearst Ranch, San Luis Obispo County
In 2005, the Hearst Corporation, American Land Conservancy, California Rangeland Trust, and the State of California completed a comprehensive conservation project that permanently protects the  Hearst Ranch. The Hearst ranch is the largest privately owned working cattle ranch remaining on the California Coast. The conservation easement ensures that the scenic, open space, agricultural and natural resource values of the ranch are preserved. California Rangeland Trust holds, monitors and enforces the conservation easement.

San Lucas Ranch,  Santa Barbara County
A conservation easement agreement was placed on December 27, 2007. Originally part of the historic Spanish land grant, Rancho Cañada de los Pinos, the owners purchased San Lucas Ranch in 1924. It is part of a much larger unified ecological landscape which includes scenic mountain and riparian views of the Santa Ynez Valley and the surrounding mountain ranges. A primary value of this property is the Valley Oak savannah and grasslands that once covered most of the valley.

V6 Ranch, Fresno and Monterey Counties
In March 2001, a conservation easement protected the entire  ranch of John and Zee Varian near Parkfield, California that is part of the Diablo Range Project. The property is in one of the most productive grazing regions in the state and includes significant oak woodlands and other unique and important natural values.

Notes

External links
 California Rangeland Trust

Organizations based in California